Odengatan is a major street in the districts Vasastan and Östermalm in central Stockholm.

It is connected to Vallhallavägen, from where it passes Stockholm Public Library, Odenplan, Gustaf Vasa Church and Vasaparken up to S:t Eriksplan. The street's width is about 30 metres and its length is about 1850 metres.

Buildings at Odengatan 
Stockholm Public Library
Gustaf Vasa Church
Latvian Embassy

See also 
 Geography of Stockholm

Streets in Stockholm